Calamity is a board game released by Games Workshop in 1983.

Development
The game was co-designed by Andrew Lloyd Webber, along with Ian Livingstone and Derek Carver, and patterned after the world of high risk insurance.

Gameplay
It features a standard  Monopoly-style playing track, although players complete the track only once per game.

Reception
J C Connor reviewed Calamity! for Imagine magazine, and stated that "This is an easy game to learn but requires skill and experience to win in a convincing fashion."

References

External links

Board games introduced in 1983
Economic simulation board games
Games Workshop games